3 Ninjas is a 1992 American martial arts comedy film directed by Jon Turteltaub and starring Victor Wong, Michael Treanor, Max Elliott Slade and Chad Power. It was the only 3 Ninjas film released by Touchstone Pictures, while the others were released by TriStar Pictures. The film is about three young brothers who learn martial arts from their Japanese grandfather. The film was released on August 7, 1992, and was preceded by the Bonkers D. Bobcat cartoon Petal to the Metal in theaters.

Plot
Every summer, the Douglas brothers, 12-year-old Samuel, 11-year-old Jeffrey and 8-year-old Michael, visit their grandfather, Mori Tanaka, at his cabin. Mori trains his grandsons in the art of ninjutsu. As the summer comes to an end, Mori gives each of them a new "ninja" name based on their personalities: 'Rocky', 'Colt', and 'Tum-Tum'. Meanwhile, the brothers' father, Sam Douglas, is an FBI agent who stages a sting operation to entrap a master criminal named Hugo Snyder in the sale of warheads. Snyder escapes the trap with the use of his ninja henchmen and then visits Mori, his former business partner. Mori is tested by Snyder's henchmen and defeats them with his grandsons' help. Face to face, Snyder threatens Mori's family if he does not tell Sam, his son-in-law, to cease pursuing him.

When the boys return home, they find their father unenthusiastic to see what they had learned during their visit and more annoyed at their new names. Emily, a friend of Rocky's, compliments his new name and agrees to ride with them to school the next day. Snyder develops a plan to kidnap the brothers to use them as leverage against Sam. Snyder's right-hand man Nigel Brown contacts his irresponsible nephew Fester, a petty criminal surf punk, as well as his buddies Hammer and Marcus, to kidnap the brothers, but their plans are put on hold due to the FBI's presence. The next day, Fester and his friends follow the brothers to school, but are side-tracked by a fender bender with a police car. Emily becomes separated from the brothers and encounters a group of bullies who steal her bike. At recess, the brothers challenge the bullies to a two-on-two basketball game, spotting the bullies nine points. Despite the bullies' dirty tactics, the brothers score ten consecutive points and win back Emily's bike.

That night, Colt learns that Snyder is the criminal their father is pursuing. Fester and his friends break into the house with a fake pizza order, subduing the boys' babysitter. Believing it to be a home invasion, the brothers suit up in their ninja gear and fight back using their surroundings and numerous household items. After regrouping in the boys' bedroom, Fester uses Rocky's homemade phone to call Emily over and they take her hostage, but the boys are able to outsmart and defeat Fester's group. After freeing the babysitter, the brothers are overpowered by Snyder's bodyguard Rushmore and are taken captive to Snyder's ship in the harbor. The brothers escape and manage to subdue Rushmore while Mori infiltrates the ship to rescue the brothers. Snyder confronts Mori and challenges him to a fight for the brothers' freedom. Due to his youth and speed (and a hidden pepper bomb), Snyder gains the upper hand, until Mori gags Snyder with a handful of Tum-Tum's jelly beans and finally defeats him. Enraged, Snyder grabs a gun from one of his subordinates and attempts to shoot Mori and the boys, but is suddenly shot in the shoulder and subdued by Sam, who arrives with his backup to arrest Snyder, Brown, and their henchmen. Sam tells his sons that he will let them continue to visit their grandpa every summer and takes the rest of the night off from work to get pizza with the family, including Mori, who hates pizza.

International version
The international cut of the film features a number of small parts of scenes that were cut from the movie for its American release, most likely to ensure a PG rating. Among the cut scenes are (not all-inclusive): extra footage of Snyder's escape in which he confronts two FBI agents whom he promptly defeats, a scene in which Fester fires a gun in the convenience store while Hammer and Marcus tie up the clerk behind the counter, a scene in which Fester gets the Douglas family address from Brown, additional footage of Grandpa trailing Snyder to his ship hideout, numerous small portions of the scene where the kidnappers invade the Douglas household, including Colt beating them after covering them under a tarp in the room being renovated, and a scene of Fester asking his uncle (Brown) if he can be paid, extra sarcastic dialogue while the boys are locked up in Snyder's ship, and an extended scene in which the boys are reunited with Grandpa. Additionally, in the international version the boys lose the basketball challenge and their bikes, so the film ends with a scene in which they fight the bullies to get them back. The international cut is available on Vudu.

Cast

Reception
As of August 2020, the film held a 32% rating on Rotten Tomatoes, based on 22 reviews. The site's consensus reads: "3 Ninjas might be exciting enough for younger action enthusiasts, but they deserve better -- and there's no shortage of superior options to choose from". Stephen Holden of The New York Times said that "the film can't seem to make up its mind whether it wants to be a comedy, a fantasy or an adventure film" and that "beneath all the excitement, the message that 3 Ninjas conveys is anything but reassuring". It did attain a favorable response from Kevin Thomas of the Los Angeles Times, who said that "although their attention may wander, parents can be grateful that there's some substance as well as fun in this Disney release, for martial arts is presented as a matter of defense rather than aggression, emphasizing that it is a matter of mind and spirit as well as body and requiring resourcefulness and discipline". Later on, it would receive a cult following for its camp factor and spawned three less-successful sequels 3 Ninjas Kick Back, 3 Ninjas Knuckle Up, and 3 Ninjas: High Noon at Mega Mountain.

Box office
The film opened at the box office in the #4 position, and by the end of its 6-week run in theaters grossed US$29,000,301 domestically. Considering that the film was budgeted at $2.5 million, it was a huge financial success, and turned out to be the most profitable film of the year in terms of cost-to-gross ratio.

Legacy
Each April, Slade, Power and Treanor host an annual screening and Q&A in Oak Park, a neighborhood in Ventura County, where the movie was filmed.

References

External links

 
 
 

 
1992 action comedy films
1990s English-language films
1992 films
1992 independent films
1992 martial arts films
American action comedy films
American children's comedy films
American independent films
American martial arts comedy films
Fictional trios
Films about brothers
Films about families
Films directed by Jon Turteltaub
Films set in the United States
Ninja films
Touchstone Pictures films
1990s American films